The Faculty of Philology  is one of the constituent schools of the University of Belgrade. The school's purpose is to train and educate its students in the academic study or practice in linguistics and philology.

History

The study of philology was established in Belgrade within the Belgrade Higher School's Department of Philosophy in 1808. The Department of Philology gained independence from the University of Belgrade Faculty of Philosophy in 1960. Many eminent international philologists contributed to the development of the Faculty of Philology, e.g. Russian Slavist Platon Kulikovsky, who was a visiting professor at the Higher School between 1877 and 1882, was the founder of Russian studies in Serbia; Englishman David Law started teaching English language and literature classes in 1907 and paved the way for the English Department (founded in 1929). Bruno Gujon from Italy worked at the Faculty from 1912 to 1914 and paved the way for Italian studies. During the post Second World War period the school established new departments, e.g. Romanian Language and Literature (1963), Spanish Language and Literature (1971), Arabic and Turkish Language and Literature Departments (1960), Chinese Language and Literature (1974), Japanese Language and Literature (1985), Scandinavian Languages (Swedish, Danish, Norwegian in 1986, starting with Norwegian Lectorate in 1979), Lectorates for Dutch (1987), Ukrainian (1989), Hebrew (1990), Library Science Department (1963), General Linguistics Department (1990), Hungarian Studies Department (1994), Greek Language and Literature Department (1995), et at.

Organization

The school is divided into departments, including: Romance Studies, Iberian Studies, Italian Studies, Oriental Studies, Library Science and Information Technology, General Linguistics, Central and South-East Europe Studies, and 8.Social Sciences and Humanities Seminar. The departments offer academic courses in Serbian, Slavic, Bulgarian, Russian, Polish, Czech, Slovakian, Ukrainian, Italian language, French language, Romanian language, Spanish language, German language, Scandinavian languages, Dutch, English, Arabic, Turkish language, Oriental philology, Japanese, Chinese, Albanian, Greek, Hungarian, General linguistics, and library studies. A number of other languages are available as minor fields of study. Optional classes given in Aromanian and organized by the Lunjina Serbian–Aromanian Association to help the Aromanian minority in Serbia have also been proposed.

Department libraries
All school's departments possess their own libraries with unique collections built up over the years. In year 2000 the stock of all libraries comprised about 600 thousand items.

Periodical publications
The school's most known periodicals include: Prilozi za književnost, jezik, istoriju i folklor (as of 1921), Anali Filološkog fakulteta (1961) and Filološki pregled (as of 1997).

Research centers
The school hosts several centers, such as: Postgraduate and Doctoral Studies Center, International Center for Slavic Studies, Center for Serbian as a Foreign Language, Publishing, Science and Research Center, and East Asian Studies Center.

Notable faculty and alumni
Famous scholars and better-known students include: Danilo Kiš, Nikola Milošević, Matija Bećković, Ljubivoje Ršumović, Ljubomir Simović, Vladislav Bajac, Vladimir Kecmanović, Igor Marojević, Snežana Samardžić-Marković. From the younger generation the better-known students include: Ana Štajdohar, Marčelo, Boško Obradović, Ana Stjelja, Sara Jovanović, Sanja Vučić.

References

External links
Official website (in Serbian, English)

University of Belgrade schools
University of Belgrade
Education in Belgrade
Linguistic research institutes